MyOperator is a cloud based telephony service provider company based in New Delhi, India. In 2011, Ankit Jain, a Birla Institute of Technology, Mesra (BIT Mesra) alumnus, founded the company. It uses Cloud Telephony to provide virtual and toll-free numbers to small and medium enterprises in India. Its patented technology enables a client to get a working cloud telephony account in 30 seconds.

It provided Aam Aadmi Party (AAP) a crowd sourced calling campaign which reached over 500,000 people in Delhi, before the 2013 Delhi Legislative Assembly election.

History
MyOperator was started by Ankit Jain as VoiceTree Technologies, with a focus on rural voice-based infotainment mobile channels. It gained good call volume but failed to generate enough revenue. In March 2013, VoiceTree revived and MyOperator, a cloud-based call management system aimed at SMEs was launched.

Awards 
In 2014, NASSCOM identified VoiceTree Technologies as one of the Top 10 companies in the Emerge "League of 50" for 2014.

References

External links

2011 establishments in Delhi
Companies based in New Delhi
Companies established in 2011
Telecommunications companies of India